Tirrell Greene (born May 15, 1972) is a former American football offensive lineman. He attended the University of Miami, where he was an All-American in 1994. Greene went undrafted in the 1995 NFL Draft and played one season for the Frankfurt Galaxy.

References

1972 births
Living people
Miami Hurricanes football players
Frankfurt Galaxy players
Players of American football from Pittsburgh